Claudia Schmidtke (born 29 March 1966) is a German cardiologist and politician of the Christian Democratic Union (CDU) who served as a member of the Bundestag from the state of Schleswig-Holstein from 2017 to 2021.

Political career 
Schmidtke became a member of the Bundestag in the 2017 German federal election. She defeated Gabriele Hiller-Ohm from the SPD, becoming the first CDU MP for the seat since 1969. She was a member of the Health Committee. Schmidtke lost her seat at the 2021 German federal election.

Other activities

Government agencies
 Federal Agency for Civic Education (BPB), Alternate Member of the Board of Trustees (2018–2021)

Non-profit organizations
 University of Lübeck, Member of the Board of Trustees
 Music and Congress Centre of Lübeck (MuK), Member of the Supervisory Board
 Cardiothoracic Surgery Network (CTSNet), Member
 European Association for Cardio-Thoracic Surgery (EACTS), Member

References

External links 

  
 Bundestag biography 

1966 births
Living people
Members of the Bundestag for Schleswig-Holstein
Female members of the Bundestag
21st-century German women politicians
Members of the Bundestag 2017–2021
Members of the Bundestag for the Christian Democratic Union of Germany